Whitby is a federal electoral district (riding) in Ontario consisting of the entire town of Whitby, Ontario. The boundaries for Whitby were created by the 2012 federal electoral boundaries redistribution and were legally defined in the 2013 representation order. The riding came into existence upon the call of the 42nd Canadian federal election in October 2015. It was created out of the district of Whitby—Oshawa. It is a key Liberal-Conservative marginal seat.

Demographics 
According to the 2021 Canada Census

Ethnic groups: 62.2% White, 12.0% South Asian, 9.1% Black, 3.6% Chinese, 2.6% Filipino, 2.4% Indigenous, 1.6% West Asian, 1.2% Latin American, 1.0% Arab

Languages: 75.5% English, 1.7% Urdu, 1.6% Tamil, 1.5% Mandarin, 1.3% French, 1.1% Spanish, 1.0% Italian

Religions: 54.3% Christian (25.7% Catholic, 4.9% Anglican, 4.2% United Church, 2.7% Christian Orthodox, 1.9% Pentecostal, 1.4% Presbyterian, 1.1% Baptist, 12.4% Other), 6.7% Muslim, 5.4% Hindu, 31.6% None

Median income: $48,000 (2020)

Average income: $63,000 (2020)

Members of Parliament

This riding has elected the following Members of Parliament:

Election results

References

Ontario federal electoral districts
Whitby, Ontario
2013 establishments in Ontario